Jinga may refer to:

Nzinga of Ndongo and Matamba
Kamana, Queen of Jinga
Ion Jinga
Kami no Kiba: Jinga